Søren Svejstrup (born 5 December 1937) is a Danish diver. He competed in the men's 10 metre platform event at the 1964 Summer Olympics. He played Sixten Sparre in 1967 Danish film Elvira Madigan.

References

1937 births
Living people
Danish male divers
Olympic divers of Denmark
Divers at the 1964 Summer Olympics
Divers from Copenhagen